"Breathe" is a song by English DJ and record producer Jax Jones featuring vocals by Norwegian singer Ina Wroldsen and co-written by Fred Gibson. It was released on 1 December 2017 through Polydor Records. The song has peaked at number seven on the UK Singles Chart, number four in Ireland and number five in Scotland.

Music video
The official music video was released on 23 January 2018, through Jax Jones's official YouTube account. It features dancers Shala Iwaskow and Shaadow Sefiroth filmed in several locations in London at night, most notably the Natural History Museum and the Millennium Bridge.

Usage in media
In early summer 2018, the song was used in a TV commercial for El Corte Inglés, both in Spain and in Portugal.

Charts

Weekly charts

Year-end charts

Certifications

References

2017 songs
2017 singles
Jax Jones songs
Ina Wroldsen songs
Songs written by Ina Wroldsen
Songs written by Jax Jones
Songs written by MNEK
Number-one singles in the Commonwealth of Independent States
Number-one singles in Poland
Number-one singles in Russia
Songs written by Fred Again
Song recordings produced by Mark Ralph (record producer)
Song recordings produced by Jax Jones